Melin-y-Coed is a small rural village in the county of Conwy, Wales. (Translated as Mill in the Woods into English). The earliest surviving building in the village is Cyffdy Hall, built in 1596.

The village lies about a mile and a half southeast of the town of Llanrwst. Behind the village to the east the hills rise to Moel Seisiog (467m). The B5427 links Melin-y-Coed to Llanrwst.

Listed buildings

The Bethel Chapel (built 1822, rebuilt 1879) and two bridges also dating from 1822 are Grade II listed.
Cyffdy Hall together with its Coach House is Grade II* listed.

References 

Villages in Conwy County Borough